Xu Xin (born 19 April 1994) is a Chinese professional footballer who currently plays for Chinese Super League club Shanghai Port.

Club career
Xu Xin started his football career when he joined Tianjin Teda's youth academy in 2006. After switching to Shanghai Shenhua's youth academy, he then transferred to La Liga side Atlético Madrid's youth academy in 2010. On 11 May 2013, Xu was promoted to Atlético Madrid B's squad and made his debut for the club on 12 May 2013 in a 1–0 loss against CD Marino, coming on as a substitute for Vicente Romero in the 66th minute.  He made his debut for Atlético Madrid C on 25 August 2013 in a 2–2 draw against AD Parla, coming on as a substitute for Samuel Villa in the 71st minute.

On 25 December 2015, Xu transferred to Chinese Super League side Guangzhou Evergrande for a fee of €4.3 million. He made his debut for the club on 1 April 2016 in a 2–0 win against Guangzhou R&F, coming on as a substitute for Huang Bowen in the 71st minute. On 1 April 2017, Xu suffered a ligament rupture in his left ankle in a 3–2 win against Shanghai SIPG. In July 2018, Xu was reportedly about to be loaned to China League One side Wuhan Zall for a half season. However, the deal couldn't be completed due to Guangzhou Evergrande and Wuhan Zall falling out over a dispute about Yang Chaosheng.

On 12 April 2021, Xu joined fellow Chinese Super League club Shandong Taishan. He helped Shandong win the club's first Chinese Super League title since in 11 years in his debut season, which was his personal 4th league title. On 9 January 2022, he started in a 1-0 win against Shanghai Port in the 2021 Chinese FA Cup final, completing a domestic double.

International career
On 11 November 2021, Xu made his international debut in a 1–1 draw against Oman in the third round of 2022 FIFA World Cup qualification. On 1 February 2022, he scored his first international goal in a 3–1 defeat against Vietnam in the same phase.

Career statistics

International statistics

International goals

Honours

Club
Guangzhou Evergrande
Chinese Super League: 2016, 2017, 2019
Chinese FA Cup: 2016
Chinese FA Super Cup: 2016, 2017, 2018

Shandong Taishan
Chinese Super League: 2021
Chinese FA Cup: 2021

References

External links

1994 births
Living people
Chinese footballers
China international footballers
Footballers from Shenyang
Association football midfielders
Atlético Madrid B players
Atlético Madrid C players
Guangzhou F.C. players
Shandong Taishan F.C. players
Segunda División B players
Tercera División players
Chinese Super League players
Chinese expatriate footballers
Expatriate footballers in Spain
Chinese expatriate sportspeople in Spain